Noble rot is the beneficial form of a grey fungus, Botrytis cinerea, affecting wine grapes. Infestation by Botrytis requires moist conditions. If the weather stays wet, the damaging form, "grey rot", can destroy crops of grapes. Grapes typically become infected with Botrytis when they are ripe. If they are then exposed to drier conditions and become partially raisined, this form of infection is known as noble rot. Grapes picked at a certain point during infestation can produce particularly fine and concentrated sweet wine. Wines produced by this method are known as botrytized wines.

Origins
According to Hungarian legend, the first aszú (a wine using botrytised grapes) was made by Laczkó Máté Szepsi in 1630. However, mention of wine made from botrytised grapes appears before this in the Nomenklatura of Fabricius Balázs Sziksai, which was completed in 1576. A recently discovered inventory of aszú predates this reference by five years. When vineyard classification began in 1730 in the Tokaj region, one of the gradings given to the various terroirs centered on their potential to develop Botrytis cinerea.

There is a popular story that the practice originated independently in Germany in 1775, where the Riesling producers at Schloss Johannisberg (Geisenheim, in the Rheingau region) traditionally awaited the say-so of the estate owner, Heinrich von Bibra, Bishop of Fulda, before cutting their grapes. In this year (so the legend goes), the abbey messenger was robbed en route to delivering the order to harvest and the cutting was delayed for three weeks, time enough for the botrytis to take hold. The grapes were presumed worthless and given to local peasants, who produced a surprisingly good, sweet wine which subsequently became known as Spätlese, or late harvest wine. In the following few years, several different classes of increasing must weight were introduced, and the original Spätlese was further elaborated, first into Auslese in 1787 and later Eiswein in 1858 (although Eiswein is usually made from grapes not affected by Botrytis).

Viticulture and uses

In some cases, inoculation occurs when spores of the fungus are sprayed over the grapes, while some vineyards depend on natural inoculation from spores present in the environment.

The fungus perforates the grapes' skin, allowing water in the grape to evaporate during dry conditions, and thereby raising the sugar concentration in the remaining juice.

Some of the finest botrytized wines are picked berry by berry in successive  (French for "selections").

Other wines of this type include the Romanian Grasă de Cotnari, French Coteaux du Layon, French Monbazillac, Austrian Ausbruch and South African Noble Late Harvest (NLH). Depending on conditions, the grapes may be only minimally botrytized. Botrytis has also been imported for use by winemakers in California and Australia.

References

External links 

University of California Pest Management Guidelines for Grape Botrytis Bunch Rot
The Ohio State University Botrytis Bunch Rot Fact Sheet
Botrytis Genome Sequencing Project, INRA, France

Fungal grape diseases
 
Oenology
Viticulture